The 2016 Sudamérica Rugby Women's Sevens was the 12th edition of the tournament. It was hosted by Brazil as a test event for the Rio 2016 Olympic Games. The tournament was held at the Deodoro Stadium from 5–6 March and consisted of eight teams.

Teams

Pool stage

Pool A

Pool B

Finals

Cup Quarterfinals

5th–7th Place Playoff

Final standings

References 

2016 in women's rugby union
2016 rugby sevens competitions
Rugby sevens competitions in Brazil
Rugby sevens competitions in South America
2016 in South American rugby union
March 2016 sports events in South America